Indianapolis Public Library Branch No. 6, also known as Spades Park Library (Carnegie), is a historic Carnegie library located in Indianapolis, Indiana.  It was built in 1911–1912, and is a two-story, "L"-shaped, Italian Renaissance style masonry building on a raised basement.  It has a terra cotta tile hipped roof, decorative brickwork, limestone accents, and elements of American Craftsman and Arts and Crafts style decorative elements. It was one of five libraries constructed from the $120,000 the Carnegie Foundation gave the City of Indianapolis in 1909 to be used towards the construction of six branch libraries. The library remains in operation as the Spades Park Branch of the Indianapolis Public Library.

The Spades Library underwent an extensive restoration  in 1987. It was listed on the National Register of Historic Places in 2016.

See also
List of Carnegie libraries in Indiana

References

Carnegie libraries in Indiana
Libraries on the National Register of Historic Places in Indiana
Tudor Revival architecture in Indiana
Library buildings completed in 1912
Buildings and structures in Indianapolis
National Register of Historic Places in Indianapolis